Ajay Veer Yadav (born 20 September 1970) is the General Secretary of Government Schools Teachers Association of India. Currently representing the teachers serving under the Government of Delhi and Delhi Directorate of Education he has been active in teacher politics since 1995.

Early life 
Ajay Veer Yadav was born on 20 September 1970 in an Ahir family to Kanwar Singh and Kanta Devi. He completed his higher education from Delhi.

Teachers Union politics

Campaign for the removal of pay anomalies 
After assuming the office as the General Secretary of Government Schools Teachers Association in 2014 the association led a campaign for the removal of pay anomalies. Delegation of the Association met Dr. Jitendra Singh, Union Minister of State for PMO. Ajay Veer Yadav met with Rajnath Singh and Najeeb Jung, former Lt. Governor of Delhi regarding these demands.

References 

1970 births
Living people